The Vancouver Film Critics Circle (VFCC) was founded in 2000 by David Spaner and Ian Caddell, in order to help promote Canadian films and the British Columbia Film and Television Industry. Its membership includes print, radio, on-line, and television critics, either based in Vancouver or with Vancouver outlets.

VFCC Notable Milestones
The VFCC celebrated its 13th anniversary of giving awards to the year’s best films on January 7, 2013 at the Railway Club. The event is the only among Canadian critics’ groups that presents a full slate of international awards and a full slate of Canadian awards. The VFCC also presents a Best of British Columbia Award and the Ian Caddell Achievement Award that goes to an individual or group that has made a significant contribution to the local film and television industry.

Award categories

International
Best Film
Best Director
Best Screenplay
Best Actor
Best Actress
Best Supporting Actor
Best Supporting Actress
Best Documentary
Best Foreign Language Film

Canadian
Best Canadian Film
Best Canadian Documentary
Best British Columbia Film
Best Director of a Canadian Film
Best Screenplay for a Canadian Film
Best Actor in a Canadian Film
Best Actress in a Canadian Film
Best Supporting Actor in a Canadian Film
Best Supporting Actress in a Canadian Film

References

Canadian film critics associations
Organizations based in Vancouver
2000 establishments in British Columbia
Culture of Vancouver